Enns is a surname. Notable people with the surname include:

 Dietrich Enns (born 1991), American baseball player
 Harry Enns (1931–2010), Canadian politician
 Leonard Enns (born 1948), Canadian classical music composer
 Paul P. Enns (born 1937), American theologian and biblical scholar
 Peter Enns (born 1961), American theologian
 Siegfried Enns (1924–2020), Canadian politician

Russian Mennonite surnames